Barisal-5 is a constituency represented in the Jatiya Sangsad (National Parliament) of Bangladesh since 2019 by Zahid Faruk of the Awami League.

Boundaries 
The constituency encompasses Barisal City Corporation and Barisal Sadar Upazila.

History 
The constituency was created for the first general elections in newly independent Bangladesh, held in 1973.

Members of Parliament

Elections

Elections in the 2010s 
Shawkat Hossain Hiron died in April 2014. Jebunnesa Afroz, his widow, was elected in a June 2014 by-election.

Shawkat Hossain Hiron, of the Awami League, was elected unopposed in the 2014 general election after opposition parties withdrew their candidacies in a boycott of the election.

Elections in the 2000s

Elections in the 1990s 
Nasim Biswas died in March 1998. Majibur Rahman Sarwar, of the BNP, was elected in a mid-1998 by-election.

In October 1991, Abdur Rahman Biswas became President of Bangladesh, vacating his parliamentary seat. M. R. Sarwar was elected in a December 1991 by-election.

References

External links
 

Parliamentary constituencies in Bangladesh
Barishal District